Manish Mundra (born 22 April 1973) is an Indian film producer who has produced numerous Bollywood films like Ankhon Dekhi, Masaan, Kadvi Hawa and many more to his credit.

Early years and personal life 
Manish Mundra was born in Deoghar, Jharkhand in a Marwari family from Jodhpur, Rajasthan. As a child, he sold cold drinks and saris to help his family. He later moved to Jodhpur to do his Master of Business Administration.

From 2000 to 2002, he first moved to Bombay for a job. After some time, he moved to Indonesia, Thailand and then Nigeria where he joined Indorama Eleme Petrochemicals as the CEO (Africa) and MD.

After few years he moved to India to become a film producer, In 2014 he started Drishyam Films, Production House. Since then, he has produced movies like Masaan (2015), Waiting (2016), Umrika (2016), Dhanak (2016), Newton (2017), Rukh (2017) Kadvi Hawa (2017) .

In 2017 Dhanak won the National Award for Best Children’s Film, Newton was chosen for India’s entry into the Oscars and Kadvi Hawa received a Special Mention at the National Film Awards this year.

Philanthropy 
He is a philanthropist and in 2014, he donated Rs 50 lakhs to bail out the Mumbai Film Festival. 

During the COVID-19 pandemic, he helped hospitals in India with PPE kits, ventilators and oxygen concentrators. He also helped migrant workers leaving the cities to return to their native places with rations and financial help. 

He has also donated bicycles to the Mumbai dabbawalas to help them distribute food.

Filmography

See also 
 Sonu Sood, a film personality known for his philanthropic work during the COVID-19 pandemic

References

External links 

1973 births
Living people
Film producers from Mumbai
Hindi film producers